William Ledyard Rodgers (February 4, 1860 – May 7, 1944) was a vice admiral of the United States Navy. His career included service in the Spanish–American War and World War I, and a tour as President of the Naval War College. Rodgers was also a noted historian on military and naval topics, particularly relating to ancient naval warfare.

He was the third generation in a well-known family of able naval officers. He was the son of Rear Admiral John Rodgers (1812–1882), who fought in the Second Seminole War (1839–1842) and the American Civil War (1861–1865), and the grandson of Commodore John Rodgers (1772–1838), who fought in the War of 1812 (1812–1814). Rodgerss relative, one of the Rodgers Naval dynasty, John Rodgers, born in 1881, was a pioneering early aviator, reaching the rank of commander before dying in a plane crash in 1926.

Naval career
Born on 4 February 1860 in Washington, D.C., the son of John Rodgers (1812–1882) and Ann Elizabeth Hodge Rodgers (1823–1897), William Ledyard Rodgers entered the United States Naval Academy on 11 June 1874 and graduated in 1878. He served aboard the steamer  from 1878 to 1879 and at the United States Naval Observatory in Washington, D.C., from 1880 to 1881, and was promoted to midshipman on 4 June 1880. He served aboard the corvette  on the European Station from 1881 to 1884 and was promoted to ensign on 1 April 1882.

Rodgers was on special duty at the United States Department of the Navy in Washington, D.C., from 1884 to 1885, then received instruction in torpedo service during 1886. He was assigned to the Office of Naval Intelligence from 1886 to 1888, then to special duty aboard the protected cruiser  from 1889 to 1892, being promoted to lieutenant, junior grade, on 4 May 1889 while aboard Atlanta. From December 1892 until 1895, he served at the Washington Navy Yard in Washington, D.C., and was promoted to lieutenant in February 1894. In October 1895, Rodgers reported for duty aboard the screw gunboat , which operated as a training ship during his tour. Leaving Alliance, he was assigned in May 1897 to the Columbian Iron Works and Dry Dock Company, which was engaged in ship construction for the U.S. Navy in Baltimore, Maryland.

In January 1898, Rodgers took command of the torpedo boat , leading her into combat when the Spanish–American War broke out in April 1898. Foote assisted in the blockade of Cuba, patrolling the coast closely, and fought the first battle of the war on 23 or 25 April 1898 (sources vary), when she approached the harbor at Cárdenas, Cuba, to scout shipping and exchanged fire with the Spanish Navy gunboat Ligera. Spanish sources claim that Foote was badly damaged and forced to withdraw, but U.S. sources state that she simply withdrew. Foote also bombarded Morro Island on 29 April 1898, and during the summer carried mail, dispatches, and supplies from Key West, Florida, to the blockading squadron off Cuba until the end of the war in August 1898.

Rodgers returned to duty at the Washington Navy Yard on 3 November 1898.  On 15 May 1900, he reported aboard the screw sloop-of-war , which was in service with the Training Squadron, and was aboard her until 1901, being promoted to lieutenant commander on 19 February 1901. He was assigned to the battleship   before moving on to a tour on the Naval War College staff at Newport, Rhode Island. After that, he was executive officer of the battleship  in the United States Asiatic Fleet before becoming commanding officer of the Asiatic Fleet gunboat  in 1906.

Relinquishing command of Wilmington, Rodgers attended the United States Army War College in Carlisle, Pennsylvania, in 1907–1908.  While there, he learned about the "applicability system" or "estimate of the situation," requiring that war planning be developed through a four-step process involving "statement of mission, assessment of enemy forces and intentions, assessment of own forces, and evaluation of possible courses of action." He suggested to Raymond P. Rodgers, who served as President of the Naval War College from 1909 to 1911, that the Navy adopt a similar approach. Raymond P. Rodgers introduced it into war planning at the college during his presidency, and it has remained a part of Navy war planning ever since.

In 1909, William Ledyard Rodgers assumed command of the battleship . He then relieved Raymond P. Rodgers as President of the Naval War College on 20 November 1911, serving as president until 15 December 1913. He next took command of the new battleship , then in 1915 became a member of the General Board of the United States Navy in Washington, D.C.

In 1916, Rodgers was promoted to rear admiral and given command of the United States Atlantic Fleets Training and Service Force, the command he continued to hold after the United States entered World War I in April 1917. In this capacity, he oversaw the training of Atlantic Fleet personnel and the repair and replenishment of its ships through the end of the war in November 1918, using first the repair ship  and later the store ship  as his flagship. He received the Navy Cross for superior performance in this position.

In December 1918, Rodgers was promoted to vice admiral and on 7 December 1918 he took command of the United States Asiatic Fleet, a position he held until 1 September 1919. In 1920, he returned to the U.S. Navys General Board in Washington, D.C., to serve as its Senior Member, the position he held until his retirement in 1924. During this tour, he also served on the Advisory Commission to the Conference on the Limitation of Armaments in 1921–1922, and as a technical adviser to the Committee of Jurists on the Laws of War at The Hague in the Netherlands in 1923.

Military and naval historian and author
Rodgers had a lifelong love of military and naval history. Throughout his life, he consistently showed an interest in actual hands-on testing and physical examination of history. He wrote many articles on various historical subjects, such as the rate of fire of the Welsh longbow, which were published in various military journals and magazines of the time, and in 1907 published a book titled A Study of Attacks Upon Fortified Harbors (Artillery Notes), published by Artillery School Press.

In retirement, Rodgers continued to pursue his passion for military and naval history. He wrote the introduction to Captain Dudley Knoxs classic A History of the United States Navy, published in 1936. He served as president of the Naval Historical Foundation from 1933 to 1943, and donated much of his fathers book collection as well as volumes of his own collection to the United States Department of the Navy.

Rodgers most enduring legacy are two classic works on naval warfare he wrote in retirement, titled Greek and Roman Naval Warfare: A Study of Strategy, Tactics and Ship Design from Salamis (480 B.C.) to Actium, published in 1937, and Naval Warfare Under Oars, 4th to 16th Centuries: A Study of Strategy, Tactics and Ship Design, published in 1939. While the former work focuses on the ancient Greek and Roman world of the Mediterranean Sea, the latter work  also contains chapters on such rare topics as Viking and medieval naval warfare. Rodgers was primarily a military historian who described battles and tactics, but his works also derive principles of naval warfare in the ancient and medieval worlds, and contain some detailed descriptions of archeological finds and commentary on the limitations of materials and the design of ancient and medieval naval vessels.

Death
Rodgers died at the National Naval Medical Center in Bethesda, Maryland, on 7 May 1944, at the age of 84. He is buried at Oak Hill Cemetery in the Georgetown section of Washington, D.C.

Awards
 Navy Cross

Notes

References
 Department of the Navy Library, United States Navy Naval History and Heritage Command "Rodgers Family Collection"
 Library of Congress: Rodgers Family Papers, 2011.
 Past Presidents of the Naval War College
 
 Hamersly, Lewis Randolph. The Records of Living Officers of the U.S. Navy and Marine Corps, Seventh Edition, New York: L. R. Hamersly Company, 1902.
 Miller, Edward S. War Plan Orange: The U.S. Strategy to Defeat Japan, 1897–1945. Annapolis, Maryland: Naval Institute Press, 1991. .
 Rodríguez González, Agustín Ramón. Victorias por Mar de los Españoles. Grafite Ediciones (2006).

External links
 Past Presidents of the Naval War College

1860 births
1944 deaths
Writers from Washington, D.C.
Presidents of the Naval War College
United States Navy admirals
United States Naval Academy alumni
Naval War College faculty
United States Army War College alumni
United States Navy personnel of the Spanish–American War
United States Navy personnel of World War I
Recipients of the Navy Cross (United States)
American naval historians
American male non-fiction writers
Burials at Oak Hill Cemetery (Washington, D.C.)
People of the Office of Naval Intelligence
Rodgers family